The Peterborough School, formerly Peterborough High School, is a private school located in Peterborough, England. Founded as a day school for girls (with girl boarders until July 2013), it is now a coeducational day school.

Overview
The Peterborough School is an independent school educating boys and girls from ages 6 weeks to 18 years. It is situated on a campus in central Peterborough. As a Woodard school, The Peterborough School is a member of the largest collection of independent Church of England schools in England and Wales.

History
The school was established in 1895 as a girls' day school on Park Road, Peterborough, and moved to the present ten-acre site at Westwood House, Thorpe Road in 1936. The school was originally called "Peterborough High School"  and changed its name to Westwood House in 1936. In 1991 the name changed to "Peterborough High School".  The school became a charitable trust and was incorporated into the "List of Woodard Schools" (Woodard Corporation)  in 1968. The school is managed by its own governing body, some of whose members are Woodard Fellows.

Boys were first admitted into the junior school. Its success and the demand of parents led the administration to extend coeducation to the rest of the school from September 2010.

At the High Court in London in January 2004, a father failed to compel Oxfordshire County Council to pay £2,500 a year towards the child's £4,000 a term fees.

The school ended boarding at the end of the summer term in July 2013.

Academics

In the 2009 GCSEs 56% achieved A*-A grades. The following year, it achieved a 100% pass rate with 64% gaining all A* or A grades.

References

External links
 
 

Woodard Schools
Private schools in Peterborough
Buildings and structures in Peterborough
Educational institutions established in 1895
1895 establishments in England
Church of England private schools in the Diocese of Peterborough